The Riverview Hotel is a heritage-listed pub located in Balmain, a suburb in the inner west region of Sydney, in the state of New South Wales, Australia. Australian swimming champion, Dawn Fraser, was publican of the Riverview from 1978 to 1983.

History
The Riverview Hotel was built in 1880. Patrick Kearney was licensee of the Tooheys pub in 1881. Joseph Bergin took over the licence from Herbert Edwards in August 1887. In December 1899 Bergin was granted permission by the water licensing court to change the hotel's name and it became known as Bergin's Hotel. Bergin sold the licence, lease, goodwill and furniture to Tooth and Company in 1908 and was again known as the Riverview Hotel from 1909. In 1929 John Reay Palmer transferred his licence to Jack Richards May. A year later the licence was transferred from William Tierney to John Rogers Walter, while in 1936 Charles E. Davis took over from George Stanley Bettley as licensee. David Joseph Cloughessy was proprietor in 1938.

In late 2008, after renovation, it reopened.

The Riverview Hotel is listed on the Inner West Council local government heritage register. The corner building was built in the Arts and Crafts style with distinctive brick work details. It was remodelled again .

See also

 List of public houses in Australia

References

Pubs in Sydney
Balmain, New South Wales